Kolasa is a surname. Notable people with the surname include:

Adam Kolasa (born 1975), Polish pole vaulter
Bolesław Kolasa (1920–2007), Polish ice hockey player
Marian Kolasa (born 1959), Polish pole vaulter

See also
 

Polish-language surnames